The men's 10 meter platform, also reported as platform diving, was one of four diving events on the Diving at the 1976 Summer Olympics programme.

The competition was split into two phases:

Preliminary round (26 July)
Divers performed ten dives. The eight divers with the highest scores advanced to the final.
Final (27 July)
Divers performed another set of ten dives and the score here obtained determined the final ranking.

Results

References

Sources
 

Men
1976
Men's events at the 1976 Summer Olympics